Pequeños Gigantes is a Colombian variety and kids drama TV show. In its subsequent seasons it had musical sections,  short juvenile dramas, interviews, arts, drawing and singing contests.

Directed/created by Toni Navia and Jaime Santos. Written by Camándula.

First season
Gabriela Lizzette Duque Hiroshi.

Other seasons
Adults
Luis Fernando Ardila
Mile
Chato Latorre
Manuel Busquets
Yaneth Waldman
Carlos Vives
Fernando Garavito
Andres Navia
Norberto Vallejo

Kids
Margarita Restrepo
Jonfaber Monsalve
Julio Caesar Bustos
Roberto Cano
Juan Sebastián Aragón
Lina Maria Navia
Dr Camila Devis-Rozental
Juanita Devis
Evelyn Christopher
Jennifer Christopher
Carolina Sabino
Julieta Garcia
Sonia Galkin "Romero"
Tito Duarte
Ana Maria Orozco
Veronica Orozco
Carolina Cuervo
Valentina Giraldo
Juan Diego Giraldo
Henry Alejandro Corzo
Alfonso Gutierrez Forero

Colombian television series